Lee Jack Crooks (born 18 September 1963) is an English former professional rugby league footballer who played in the 1980s and 1990s, and coached in the 1990s, 2000s and 2010s.

Background
Lee Crooks was born in Hull, East Riding of Yorkshire, England, and he is the father of the rugby league footballer; Ben Crooks.

Playing career

Club career

Hull
Crooks started his career at Hull FC, making his début at the age of 17 in 1980, and went on to make 208 appearances for the club. He also played in three Challenge Cup Finals with the club.

Crooks played as an interchange/substitute, i.e. number 15, (replacing left- Mick Crane on 60-minutes) in Hull FC's 14-14 draw with Widnes in the 1982 Challenge Cup Final during the 1981–82 season at Wembley Stadium, London on Saturday 1 May 1982, in front of a crowd of 92,147, played right- (Sammy Lloyd having played right- in the first match) in the 18-9 victory over Widnes in the 1982 Challenge Cup Final replay during the 1981–82 season at Elland Road, Leeds on Wednesday 19 May 1982, in front of a crowd of 41,171, played right- in the 14-12 defeat by Featherstone Rovers in the 1983 Challenge Cup Final during the 1982–83 season at Wembley Stadium, London on Saturday 7 May 1983, in front of a crowd of 84,969, and played left-, was captain, and scored 2-goals in the 24-28 defeat by Wigan in the 1985 Challenge Cup Final during the 1984–85 season at Wembley Stadium, London on Saturday 4 May 1985, in front of a crowd of 99,801, in what is regarded as the most marvellous cup final in living memory, which Hull narrowly lost after fighting back from 12-28 down at half-time.

Crooks played right-, and scored two goals and two drop goals in Hull FC's 18-7 victory over Bradford Northern in the 1982 Yorkshire Cup Final during the 1982–83 season at Elland Road, Leeds on Saturday 2 October 1982, played right- in the 13-2 victory over Castleford in the 1983 Yorkshire Cup Final during the 1983–84 season at Elland Road, Leeds on Saturday 15 October 1983, played right- in the 29-12 victory over Hull Kingston Rovers in the 1984 Yorkshire Cup Final during the 1984–85 season at Boothferry Park, Hull on Saturday 27 October 1984, and played right-, and scored four goals in the 24-31 defeat by Castleford in the 1986 Yorkshire Cup Final during the 1986–87 season at Headingley, Leeds on Saturday 11 October 1986.

Crooks played right- and scored four goals in Hull FC's 12-4 victory over Hull Kingston Rovers in the 1981–82 John Player Trophy Final during the 1981–82 season at Headingley, Leeds on Saturday 23 January 1982, and played left- in the 0-12 defeat by Hull Kingston Rovers in the 1984–85 John Player Special Trophy Final during the 1984–85 season at Boothferry Park, Hull on Saturday 26 January 1985.

Leeds
In June 1987, Crooks was sold to Leeds for a world record transfer fee of £150,000 (based on increases in average earnings, this would be approximately £518,900 in 2014).

Crooks played right- in Leeds' 33-12 victory over Castleford in the 1988 Yorkshire Cup Final during the 1988–89 season at Elland Road, Leeds on Sunday 16 October 1988.

Castleford
Crooks played left- and was captain in Castleford's 12-28 defeat by Wigan in the 1992 Challenge Cup Final during the 1991–92 season at Wembley Stadium, London on Saturday 2 May 1992, in front of a crowd of 77,386.

Crooks played left-, scored a goal, and was captain in Castleford's 11-8 victory over Wakefield Trinity in the 1990 Yorkshire Cup Final during the 1990–91 season at Elland Road, Leeds on Sunday 23 September 1990, and played, and was captain in the 28-6 victory over Bradford Northern in the 1991 Yorkshire Cup Final during the 1991–92 season at Elland Road, Leeds on Sunday 20 October 1991.

He also played in Castleford's 33-2 victory over Wigan in the 1993–94 Regal Trophy Final during the 1993–94 season at Headingley, Leeds on Saturday 22 January 1994.

Representative honours
Crooks became the youngest ever Great Britain Test forward when he made his début aged 19 on Saturday 30 October 1982. Unfortunately his international début was soured as Australia sent shock waves through English football with a 40–4 win at Boothferry Park in Hull with Crooks providing Britain's only score with 2 penalty goals. He was selected to go on the 1988 Great Britain Lions tour.

Lee Crooks won a cap for England while at Castleford in 1992 against Wales, and won caps for Great Britain while at Hull in 1982 against Australia (2 matches), in 1984 against France (sub), and Australia (2 matches), in 1985 against New Zealand, and New Zealand (sub), in 1986 against France (2 matches), and Australia (3 matches), in 1987 against France, while at Leeds in 1989 against France, while at Castleford in 1992 against France (2 matches), Papua New Guinea, and he was selected to go on the 1992 Great Britain Lions tour of Australia and New Zealand. He also played in 1994 against France.

Crooks also won a cap playing left-, i.e. number 8 for Yorkshire while at Castleford, scoring 2-goals in the 17-12 victory over Lancashire at Leeds' stadium on 18 September 1991.

Honoured at Western Suburbs Magpies
Lee Crooks was named in the Magpies Team of the Eighties.

Coaching career
He coached Serbia in their 2013 Rugby League World Cup qualifying campaign. In February 2014, Crooks joined the Rugby Football League (RFL) again this time in the role of England Regional Performance Coach for the North East. He will oversee the coaching at the RFL's North East Academy, as well as helping to develop community clubs in the region where he intends to build on the great work that was done by his predecessor Andy Kelly.

References

External links
(archived by web.archive.org) Profile at thecastlefordtigers.co.uk
(archived by web.archive.org) Stats → PastPlayers → C at hullfc.com
(archived by web.archive.org) Statistics at hullfc.com

1963 births
Living people
Balmain Tigers players
Castleford Tigers players
Crooks family
England national rugby league team players
English rugby league coaches
English rugby league players
Great Britain national rugby league team players
Hull F.C. captains
Hull F.C. players
Keighley Cougars coaches
Leeds Rhinos players
Rugby league props
Rugby league second-rows
Serbia national rugby league team coaches
Rugby league players from Kingston upon Hull
Western Suburbs Magpies players
York Wasps coaches
Yorkshire rugby league team players